Shiramin Rural District is in Howmeh District of Azarshahr County, East Azerbaijan province, Iran. At the census of 2006, its population was 7,862 in 2,126 households; there were 7,933 inhabitants in 2,422 households at the following census of 2011; and in the most recent census of 2016, the population of the rural district was 7,550 in 2,432 households. The largest of its nine villages was Shiramin, with 3,252 people.

References 

Azarshahr County

Rural Districts of East Azerbaijan Province

Populated places in East Azerbaijan Province

Populated places in Azarshahr County